The Gnome et Rhône 18L was a French-designed twin-row 18-cylinder air-cooled radial engine.  The 18L was a large step up in terms of displacement, power and number of cylinders.  The majority of Gnome-Rhone engines were either 7, 9 or 14 cylinders.  The engine proved not to be a success, and it was dropped in 1939 due to a poor power-to-weight ratio.

Specifications (Gnome Rhone 18L-00)

See also

References

Further reading

External links
 

1930s aircraft piston engines
Aircraft air-cooled radial piston engines
18L